Anopheles (Cellia) jamesii is a species complex of mosquito belonging to the genus Anopheles. It is found in India, and Sri Lanka, Bangladesh, Cambodia, China, Laos, Malaysia, Myanmar, Nepal, Thailand, and Vietnam. It is a potential natural vector of bancroftian filariasis in Sri Lanka.

The species is named after the malariologist S.P. James.

References

External links
Anopheles (Cellia) jamesii: a potential natural vector of Bancroftian filariasis in Sri Lanka

jamesii
Insects described in 1901